This is a list of episodes for the 1968–1975 television series Adam-12. The first season was released on DVD in 2005 by Universal Home Entertainment, while all remaining seasons were released by Shout! Factory.

Series overview

Episodes

Season 1 (1968–69)

Season 2 (1969–70)

Season 3 (1970–71)

Season 4 (1971–72)
Changes: - Malloy is promoted to Senior Lead Officer (Police Officer III+1) and wears two chevrons with a star under them on his sleeve.  MacDonald is promoted to Sergeant II and wears three chevrons plus a rocker on his sleeve.  1-Adam-12 is now a 1971 Plymouth Satellite with "012" painted on its top.

Season 5 (1972–73)
Changes: 1-Adam-12 is now a 1972 AMC Matador and will remain their police cruiser for the remainder of the series.

Season 6 (1973–74)

Season 7 (1974–75)
Changes: Malloy now has two silver stripes on his lower left sleeve, indicating 10 years with the LAPD.
Sgt. MacDonald now has three silver stripes on his lower left sleeve, indicating 15 years with the LAPD.
The station sets have been downsized; the roll call room and watch commander's office have been removed and MacDonald, Malloy and Reed now work in a single office called "Team-12".

References

External links
 
 

•episodes
Adam-12